The Winchester Royals are a collegiate summer baseball team in Winchester, Virginia. They play in the Northern division of the Valley Baseball League. Founded in 1979, the Royals are the most successful team in the history of the Valley League, with thirteen Championships won — in 1979, 1980, 1982, 1983, 1987, 1990, 1992, 1993, 1997, 2001, 2003, and 2004. This is one more than the Harrisonburg Turks, and seven more than the Waynesboro Generals, which are the second and third most winning teams in the history of the Valley League.

The Royals play their home games at Bridgeforth Field, a 1,500-seat stadium located within the city-run Jim Barnett Park.

Notable players
Notable former players who went on to play in the major leagues include Jimmy Key, Reggie Sanders, Kevin Kouzmanoff, Tyler Thornburg, and Kyle Snyder. Dayton Moore served as the Winchester manager in 1992 and 1993 and went on to become the general manager of the Kansas City Royals.

References

External links
Winchester Royals
Valley Baseball League

Amateur baseball teams in Virginia
Valley Baseball League teams
Winchester, Virginia
Baseball teams established in 1979
1979 establishments in Virginia